Jeff Braun is an American business executive and co-founder of the video game developer Maxis.

Career
Braun had successfully published font packs for the Amiga personal computer when he met Will Wright at a pizza party hosted by Chris Doner in 1987. Wright had been unsuccessful in finding a game publisher for his city-building game SimCity. Braun already had a wire frame jet fighter simulation game, SkyChase, he hoped to publish, and when he saw SimCity he told Wright that the two games would give them critical mass to start a new games publisher of their own.  They named the company Maxis.

Wright had been an employee of Broderbund when he first developed the concept, so Braun and he had to return there to clear the rights to SimCity.  Broderbund had just set up a new distribution office to counter the Electronic Arts (EA) Affiliated Label program.  Broderbund executives Gary Carlston and Don Daglow saw SimCity, recognized its potential and urged Braun to sign a distribution deal with Broderbund for the game.  Braun wanted SkyChase included in the deal, and Broderbund agreed.

The first five years of Maxis' history saw them remaining with Broderbund, before Braun added a dedicated sales force to Maxis in preparation to taking the company public.  The company's IPO took place in 1995. In 1997, after setbacks on a series of secondary titles, Braun and Wright sold Maxis to Electronic Arts for US$120 million in stock. The deal made Braun the largest shareholder in EA at the time.

Since 1997 Braun has continued to make investments in a wide range of software and technology companies in the United States and in Israel.

References

External links
 

American entertainment industry businesspeople
Place of birth missing (living people)
Year of birth missing (living people)
Maxis
Living people
American technology company founders
Video game businesspeople